The Mercedes-Benz Actros is a heavy-duty truck introduced by Mercedes-Benz at the 1996 Commercial Vehicle IAA in Hanover, Germany as the replacement for the SK. It is normally used for long-distance haulage, heavy duty distribution haulage and construction haulage. It is available in weights starting at 18 tonnes and is powered by an inline-6 diesel engine with turbocharger and intercooler. Daimler Trucks/Lorries launched the version II of the Actros in 2002, and the version III in 2007. The fourth generation of the Actros, named officially "the New Actros", launched in July 2011

First generation (MP1, 1996–2003)

The first generation Actros was introduced in 1996 and production continued until 2003 and had innovative features such as Electronically Controlled Air Brake System, Intelligent Disc Brakes on both front and rear, the introduction of the Controller Area Network (CAN) Technology for the chassis and drivetrain. Electro-pneumatic circuit on the new transmission models and the introduction of the new OM 500 V6 and V8 diesel engines with Telligent engine control.

Chassis and Powertrain

As the first truck to emerge with collaboration between designers and aerodynamic engineers, the manufacturer was able to reduce flow resistance on the Actros by 17%.

The chassis of the Actros is available in two, three or four axles with the option of air suspension. A total of 3300 mm and 6300 mm wheelbase can be selected, the construction version of the Actros is available between 3300 and 5100 mm wheelbase with the option of Leaf or Air Suspension on the front axle and Parabolic leaf springs on the rear.

The Construction variant of the Actros with 4x2 axle configuration are equipped with drum brakes.

Engine and Transmission

The Engines for the MP1 Actros are equipped with OM501LA V6 or OM502 V8 mated to a 16-speed manual gearbox or 16-speed hydropneumatically operated automatic gearbox.

Fuel Processing

Another new feature of the Actros is the Pump-Line Nozzle Fuel injection system, an improvement for the plug-in pumps that have been used for decades. Each Cylinder has its own injection pump which is driven by its own camshaft.

Second generation (MP2, 2003–2008)

The second generation Actros was released in 2003 with upgraded interior and exterior components such as the new Bi-Xenon headlamps and the updated Euro 3 emission compliant. A lighter rear axle and new special equipments as well

Mercedes Benz released a new special edition of the Actros, the Black Edition series which is only limited to 250 units. This Black Edition Series comes with a 612 hp OM502LA V8 engine with upgraded interior and exterior components such as Birds-eye maple, leather-wrapped steering wheel and seat covers with Mercedes-Benz "Star" badge, a specially-designed grille with chrome clasp, a new front apron with stainless steel grill, chrome-framed headlights and chrome-plated side mirrors.

Third generation (MP3, 2008–2012; until 2020 for export model)

The third generation Actros was introduced in 2008 at the IAA Commercial Vehicles and it was the last facelift of the previous Actros.

The Changes for the MP3 Actros is the side mirror that were adapted from the special edition models of the previous generation and has closed brackets and a slightly revised Bi-Xenon headlamps.

The third generation Actros ended production in 2011 and replaced with the New Actros but production continues in Asia and other countries until 2020.

Engines
The Mercedes Benz Actros is equipped with two types of engines. The OM 501 LA-541 and the OM 502 LA-542. The OM 501 is a 12-litre V6, and has outputs ranging from 310 HP to 480 HP. The engine management system employed by this engine is the PLD (Pumpe Leitung Düse-German abbr) which incorporates single plug-in pumps for each cylinder supplying fuel under pressure (up to 1,600 bar) to the injection valves. A control unit MR monitors all engine operating conditions via several sensors and varies the injection pressure to suit each operating condition. OM502 is a v8 engine, has an output ranging from 350 HP to 652 HP.

The fourth version offers several engine options in either Euro-5 or Euro-6. In Euro-6 use inline six engine both series OM471 with 12,8 litre engine range power output: 422 HP to 530 HP and OM473 with 15,6 litre engine range power output: 517 HP to 626 HP, with common rail pressure 2800 bar and double camshaft with 4 valve per cylinder to compliant models.

Gearbox
The second generation comes with an electronic sequential gearbox that Mercedes-Benz has dubbed the "Telligent Gearbox". It pushes forward the principle used in some earlier Mercedes-Benz tractors; using the gearshift lever to command a pneumatically actuated system that changes the gears. The Telligent gearbox utilizes a computer, together with a load-sensing system on the fifth-wheel coupling, to estimate the proper gear that the truck must be in. For example, if you want to upshift, the computer estimates the load on the tractor and the current engine mode, and gives you the proper gear for decreasing engine  On the other hand, if you want to downshift, the computer assumes you wish to overtake, and gives you a proper gear for acceleration.

There's an automatic version which works like the Tiptronic system found in Mercedes-Benz cars.

The fourth-version launched in 2011 offers exclusively the 12-speed Powershift transmission.

Operation
The system consists of a small lever mounted under the right armrest and a flat switch underneath. The lever is slightly tilted, so that it matches the natural curve of the driver's hand when it's on the armrest. The lever has two buttons on either side. When at a standstill, the driver must push the right button, then (while holding it), push the lever forward and release it select fourth fast. The current gear is shown as a large number on the main display. After doing this, the driver steps on the clutch pedal and waits for approximately two seconds. After the gearshift has completed, a double click is sounded through the speakers, and the driver proceeds with pulling off as normal.

Once moving, the driver has two choices. He or she may push or pull the lever to let the computer choose the gear for them, or they can use the splitter switch (the small switch under the lever) to pre-select gears. Either way, the gear is selected first, then the clutch is depressed. For example, if you're in fourth fast, pulling the splitter switch up once pre-selects fifth slow.

The left button (known as the 'flush button', as it is flush with the lever) is used to switch to neutral.

Cabin

The Actros cabs come in four types:
S - designed for daily operation and construction vehicles such as cement trucks. The daily cab has its front bumper lower to the ground to prevent under-run, whereas the construction version of the S cab has its front bumper higher to prevent hitting an obstacle when driving off-road on the site.
M - designed for distribution vehicles. It offers a sleeper, though comfort has not been focused on as in the L cab. It comes in short and long sleeper versions.
L - Low-roof long-haul cab, providing comfortable driving and rest for the driver.
LH "MegaSpace" - Long-haul high-roof cab, providing comfort for long driving, as well as enough space for the driver and/or passenger to freely move around the cab when needed.

Electronics
Depending on model either Actros 1, 2 or 3 the electronics may vary. For example, the braking system known as EPB or BS from Wabco incorporates ABS and ASR functions. This system is very reliable and efficient. The stopping distance in the Actros was drastically reduced as compared to its predecessor the SK. In later models of Actros 2 and all Actros 3 models the braking System was improved to EPB 2.

The Electronics in the Actros 1 are networked via Controller Area Network (CAN) in a system known as IES (Integrated Electronics System) with the instrument cluster as the Central Gateway (CGW) or the interphase. In the Actros 2 and 3 the electronics are networked also by CAN in a system known as KontAct (Concept of the Electronic systems in the Actros).

There is a wide range of other electronic features, offered as extras. These include lane assist (warns the driver if they inadvertently leave their lane), Autonomous Intelligent Cruise Control ART (which engages the brakes if the vehicle in front suddenly stops), side looking radar for warning the driver about a vehicle in their blind spot, and many more, mostly oriented towards safety. All of them are marketed as "Telligent".

Military variants

Actros Armoured Heavy Support Vehicle System (AHSVS) is a military armoured truck (86 ordered by Canadian Army in 2007) using the civilian Actros platform with a protected cab developed by Land Mobility Technologies in South Africa in cooperation with Composhield of Denmark for Mercedes-Benz.

Singapore uses military variants of the Actros for its Singapore Army - in heavy-lift logistical support roles, designated as the HMCT (High Mobility Cargo Transporter), recently as a launch platform for the air defense system and the intercontinental ballistic missile trailer. SAF operates 19 different version of Actros.

in 2010 New Zealand purchased four Actros to haul adjustable-width quad-axle low-loader semitrailers primarily for the transportation of LAVs (Light Armoured Vehicles).

New Actros (2011–present)

In 2011, The New Actros appeared for the first time. Components are not shared with its predecessors.

New Actros With MirrorCam (2018-present)

In September 2018, Mercedes Benz revealed the revised 2019 Actros at the IAA Commercial Vehicles Show in Hannover, Germany. The vehicle now has 2 colour displays (touchscreen and infotainment display behind the steering wheel) replacing the conventional instrument cluster on old Actros models and can be integrated with Android Auto or Apple CarPlay. Its outside mirrors were replaced with a camera and it can do semi-automated driving, using Active Drive Assist.

See also
Dump truck
Tractor unit
Semi-trailer and semi-trailer truck
Sisu Polar
Mitsubishi Fuso Super Great

References

Notes

Bibliography

External links
official website

Cab over vehicles
Actros
Vehicles introduced in 1989
Tank transporters
Military vehicles introduced in the 2000s